The Sipahi are a Muslim community found in the state of Gujarat in India. They are also known as Sapai or Miyabhai

History and origin

The word sipahi means a soldier in the Persian language, while the word Kasbati means a town dweller. Both these terms refer to an endogamous Gujarati Muslim community of a mixed origin. Some Sipahis claim Rajput ancestry, while others especially in Saurashtra claim to be converted Kolis. They were established in various parts of Gujarat in the 17th, 18th and 19th Century, and served as soldiers in the armies of the various rulers in the west India.

Present circumstances

The Sipahis of Saurashtra are known as Chadivati Sipahi. They have a number of clans, the main ones being the Khan, Chauhan, Sayyid, Mughal, Qureshi, Pathan, Parmar, Ghori, Rathore, Kokwana, Belim, Khokhar and Soomra. Some of these clans claim Arab ancestry, and those of the Sayyid divisions are considered superior over other groups.

The Sipahi traditionally served in the armies of the various local rulers in Kathiawar and Gujarat. Many are now farmers, while some in Jetpur are weavers, while those in Morvi are masons. Like other Gujarati Muslims, they have a caste association, the Samastha Sipahi Jamat. Historically, membership of the jamat meant the individual could call himself a Sipahi. The community no longer recruit new members, and is now a fairly distinct Muslim caste.
Sipahi are included in Central Governments list of OBC caste.

References

Social groups of Gujarat
Muslim communities of India
Muslim communities of Gujarat